Rosehill Christian School (RCS) is a PreK-12 private Christian school in the Rose Hill area of unincorporated Harris County, Texas, near Tomball, United States.

History
The school opened in 1989 as a private school for students living in the Boys' and Girls' Country facility in Hockley. As a ministry of Boys and Girls Country, it had 63 students. Several parents formed a school board after they learned that Boys' and Girls' Country had agreed to send its students to public schools. The Christian school was allowed to remain at Boys' and Girls' Country for two additional years. A member of the board bought the land for the permanent school facility.

In 1994 the school joined the Association of Christian Schools International (ASCI). In the 1995-1996 school year Rosehill Christian became a member of the Texas Association of Private and Parochial Schools (TAPPS). The Rosehill Charitable Foundation was established after two individuals paid off the school's debts in 2005. ICAA / SACS-CASI fully accredited the school in 2008. In 2014 the school had 425 students. This increased to 481 the following year. The school faced a possibility of an enrollment increase as the Grand Parkway opened.

Campus
The school's campus has  of land. Initially it had  but the school purchased additional land in 2007.

Building A, which opened in 1996, is the preschool building. Building C, which opened in 1994, serves as the chapel. Building D serves as the elementary school and upper school building. The elementary portion opened in 1993 and the upper school building was opened in 1995. Building E is an open-air pavilion that also opened in 1995. Building G, completed in 2001, is a gymnasium also known as the "Faith Activity Center." Building J is the athletic training center.

In addition a 300 seat chapel is a part o the campaign. The school's performing arts and basketball court building, which also had 13 classrooms, was scheduled to officially open on January 30, 2017. The multiplex building would allow the school to have about an additional 200 students. The 16 classroom high school building will cost $9.4 million; it will have administrative offices, art roms, band rooms, choir rooms, a computer lab, music rooms, and two science laboratories. The chapel will cost $3 million.

References

External links
 

Christian schools in Texas
Private K-12 schools in Harris County, Texas
1990 establishments in Texas
Educational institutions established in 1990